They Don't Know About Us may refer to:
They Don't Know About Us (Victoria Duffield song), a 2012 song by Victoria Duffield, featuring Cody Simpson
They Don't Know About Us (One Direction song)

See also
 They Don't Know (disambiguation)